The 1972 Speedway World Pairs Championship was the third FIM Speedway World Pairs Championship. The final took place in Borås, Sweden. The championship was won by England (24 points) who beat New Zealand after Run-Off (24 points also) and Sweden B (22 points) who beat Sweden A after a run-off.

Semifinal 1
  London
 May 11

Semifinal 2
  Debrecen
 May 14

World final
  Borås
 1 June 1972

See also
 1972 Individual Speedway World Championship
 1972 Speedway World Team Cup
 motorcycle speedway
 1972 in sports

References

1972
World Pairs